Sotto means below, under in Italian and may refer to

Comunes in Italy
Bonate Sotto in Bergamo, Lombardy
Castelfranco di Sotto in Pisa, Tuscany
Castelnovo di Sotto in Reggio Emilia
Cenate Sotto in Bergamo, Lombardy
Forni di Sotto in Udine
Mezzane di Sotto in Verona
Osio Sotto in Bergamo, Lombardy
Quarna Sotto in Verbano-Cusio-Ossola, Piedmont
Sotto il Monte Giovanni XXIII in Bergamo, Lombardy,
Tiarno di Sotto in Trentino
Tramonti di Sotto in Pordenone
Vagli Sotto in Lucca, Tuscany

Other
Sotto (surname)
Sotto Mayor Palace in Lisbon, Portugal 
Sotto voce, intentional voice lowering for emphasis
Sotto voce (music)
Sotto le tombe, a 1915 silent Italian drama film